Pennsylvania Route 15 may refer to:
Pennsylvania Route 15 (1920s)
U.S. Route 15 in Pennsylvania